Brandenburg Division is a 1960 West German war film directed by Harald Philipp and starring Hanns Ernst Jäger, Wolfgang Reichmann and Heinz Weiss. It depicts members of the German commando unit Brandenburgers during the Second World War.

The film's sets were designed by the art directors Otto Erdmann and Hans Jürgen Kiebach.

Cast
 Hanns Ernst Jäger as Jonas
 Wolfgang Reichmann as Ungerland
 Peter Neusser as Pflug
 Heinz Weiss as Dörner
 Klaus Kindler as Czerny
 Helmut Oeser as Kugelmann
 Gudrun Schmidt as Nina
 Monika Weydert as Magret
 Theo Tecklenburg as Derndorff
 Kurd Pieritz as Markwitz
 Bert Sotlar as Popoff
 Stanislav Ledinek as Mitropoulos
 Jean-Jacques Delbo as Secret Service Man
 Howard Vernon as Secret Service Man
 Kurt Waitzmann as 1. Offizier
 Georg Lehn as Polizeiführer
 Willy Schäfer as Russischer Offizier

References

Bibliography
 Giesen, Rolf.  Nazi Propaganda Films: A History and Filmography. McFarland, 2003.

External links

1960 films
1960 war films
German war films
West German films
1960s German-language films
Films directed by Harald Philipp
Films based on non-fiction books
German World War II films
1960s German films